Go for It is a 1983 Italian comedy film and spy movie parody starring the comedy team of Terence Hill and Bud Spencer. It was filmed in Miami, Florida.

Plot
The charming dodger Rosco Frazer and Doug O’Riordan, a recently released convict who was imprisoned for sinking a yacht which had annoyed him, meet each other during a rough brawl in a roadhouse. They drive off in a truck, each one thinking of the other as the trucker. Not long afterwards a highway patrol stops them for speeding, and since they cannot produce proper papers, they are mistaken for truck-jackers the police has been looking for. Thanks to Rosco being a ventriloquist, however, they are able to get away.

Doug would rather run off alone but can't get rid of Rosco, who has taken a liking to him. Together they drive to the airport in order to go into hiding in some other state. Since the flight to Miami is already booked up, they pose as passengers Steinberg and Mason, who have failed to collect their tickets, not knowing these two are CIA top agents on a mission. As such, they are intercepted by an agent just before their flight takes off and given a suitcase containing one million dollars. After various mishaps and entanglements they are taken to the CIA headquarters to meet "Tiger", their new boss, and are asked on several occasions to omit various embarrassing incidents which would cast a bad light on the CIA staff involved from their final report.

In order to track down a mysterious secret organization hiding in Miami Beach, Rosco and Doug are tasked to impersonate rich Texans. They succeed quite well at this and in the end manage to track down K1, a megalomanic criminal who wants to erase mankind's understanding of all numbers with his "K-Bomb", plunging the world into chaos. They put a stop to his plan, but in the end they can't benefit from their perks and the million dollars because an overeager "Tiger" has already given the money back to the government; a visit to the president is all they get out of it.

Cast
 Terence Hill as Rosco Frazer / Agent Steinberg
 Bud Spencer as Doug O'Riordan / Agent Mason
 Buffy Dee as Villain K1
 David Huddleston as Tiger
 Riccardo Pizzuti as Mr. Spider
 Faith Minton as The Vamp / La Fatalona
 Dan Rambo as Jeremy Scott
 Susan Teesdale as Barmaid
 Dan Fitzgerald as Leonard
 Woody Woodbury as Agent On Plane

See also    
 List of Italian films of 1983

References

External links

1983 films
English-language Italian films
Terence Hill and Bud Spencer
1980s spy comedy films
Films set in the United States
Films shot in Florida
Films scored by Franco Micalizzi
Italian buddy comedy films
Italian spy comedy films
1980s buddy comedy films
1983 comedy films
Parody films based on James Bond films
1980s English-language films
1980s Italian films